One Night Only with Ricky Martin (also known as Una Noche con Ricky Martin) was the worldwide concert tour by Puerto Rican singer Ricky Martin, in support of his 2005 album Life. The tour visited the Americas, Europe, Asia and Africa.

About the tour
Ricky Martin kicked off his tour on November 15, 2005 in Mexico. The concerts took him to  ten countries in a four-week period, including Brazil and Argentina.

The tour moved to the United States in early 2006. It started on January 15, 2006 in El Paso, Texas and visited many prestigious venues. Martin played a total of 20 sold-out concerts in 18 US cities, ending in February 2006 with two shows in his native land of Puerto Rico.

The European leg started on April 21, 2006 in Manchester, England, and included stops in London, Italy, Finland, and France among others. The tour ended in the Middle East with concerts in Lebanon, Egypt and Israel. Shows in Italy and Finland sold-out in two hours. In addition, Martin performed at the World Cup Fan Party in Berlin by the Brandenburg Gate on June 7, 2006.

MTV aired MTV Diary: Ricky Martin in November 2006, showcasing scenes from the tour, on the road and onstage.

Set list
"Til I Get to You"
"Por Arriba, Por Abajo"
"I Don't Care"
"Bella"
"Livin' la Vida Loca"
"Corazonado"
"Jaleo"
"Fuego Contra Fuego"
"Tal Vez"
"Lola, Lola"
"Perdido Sin Tí"
"El Amor de Mi Vida"
"Te Extraño, Te Olvido, Te Amo"
"It's Alright"
"La Bomba"
"María"
"La Copa de la Vida"
"Vuelve"
"Drop It on Me"

Tour dates

Festivals and other miscellaneous performances
Caracas Pop Festival
8th Wonder of the World Concert Series
Beiteddine Festival
Fan Fest Berlin

Cancellations and rescheduled shows

Box office score data

References 

Ricky Martin concert tours
2005 concert tours
2006 concert tours